Paraperipatus ceramensis is a species of velvet worm in the family Peripatopsidae. This species is grey-green with rust speckles. Females of this species have 21 or 22 pairs of legs (usually 21) and range from 13 mm to 55 mm in length. The type locality is in Seram, Indonesia.

References

Further reading 
 

Onychophorans of Australasia
Onychophoran species
Animals described in 1909